Oleg Barannik (born 20 March 1992 in Semenivka, Poltava Oblast, Ukraine) is a professional Ukrainian football striker.

International career 
He was called up to Ukraine national under-21 football team for the Euro 2013 qualification game against  on 6 September 2011, but not spent any game for this team.

References

External links 

1992 births
Living people
Ukrainian footballers
Ukrainian Premier League players
FC Vorskla Poltava players
FC Hirnyk-Sport Horishni Plavni players
FC Poltava players
Association football forwards
FC Naftovyk-Ukrnafta Okhtyrka players
FC Kramatorsk players
FC Kremin Kremenchuk players
Ukrainian First League players
Ukrainian Second League players
Sportspeople from Poltava Oblast